Cedric Badjeck (born 25 January 1995) is a Cameroonian footballer who plays as a forward for AVW '66.

Career
Ahead of the 2019–20 season, Badjeck joined Eerste Klasse club SV DFS.

References

External links
 Voetbal International profile 
 

1995 births
Living people
Cameroonian footballers
Association football forwards
Eredivisie players
Tweede Divisie players
FC Utrecht players
Excelsior Rotterdam players
De Treffers players